Grace United Methodist Church may refer to:

 Grace United Methodist Church (Wilmington, Delaware)
 Grace United Methodist Church (St. Augustine, Florida)
 Grace United Methodist Church (Keene, New Hampshire)